Dora Bouchoucha (born 11 October 1957) is a Tunisian film producer and one of the nine members of the Individual Freedoms and Equality Committee.

Biography 
Dora Bouchoucha graduated in 1987 from the Sorbonne university with a degree in English literature. In 1995, along with Ibrahim Letaïef, she co-founded her private production company called Nomadis Images. She also went on to found an association called Sud Écriture which provides training for African and Arab authors. Moreover, Bouchoucha led Carthage Film Festival 3 times: 2008, 2010 and 2014. 

Dora Bouchoucha has been present in several international film festivals as a judge, for example at the Berlinale in 2017, and as part of debates and round tables. In the same year, she was chosen as a permanent member of the CineMart committee within the Rotterdam International Film Festival. In 2018, she became part of the Individual Freedoms and Equality Committee whose mission was to work on a reform project that aligns with the 2014 Tunisian constitution and the international human rights standards. Bouchoucha was also elected to join the Academy of Motion Picture Arts and Sciences that organizes the Academy Awards as a member along with 11 other Arab filmmakers. She also joined as a jury member for the Luigi De Laurentiis Venice Award for Debut Film of the 77th Venice International Film Festival.

Awards 

 Grand officer of the Ordre national du Mérite (Tunisia, 2010).
 Commander of Ordre des Arts et des Lettres (France, 2015).
 Officer of Ordre de la République (Tunisie, 2016).
 Berlinale best first film prize (Germany, 2016).
 Chosen by the New African magazine as one of the 100 most influential Africans (2017).
 Tribute from the El Gouna Film Festival for her filmography.

Filmography

Personal life 
Dora Bouchoucha is married to Kamel Fourati. Together they have two daughters; one of them is Kenza Fourati, who's a model based in Brooklyn and Malak.

References 

Tunisian film producers
Tunisian film actresses
1957 births
Tunisian feminists
Commandeurs of the Ordre des Arts et des Lettres
Living people